Ephestia mistralella is a species of snout moth in the genus Ephestia. It was described by Pierre Millière in 1874, and is known from France, Germany, Denmark, Fennoscandia, Estonia, Latvia and the Iberian Peninsula.

The wingspan is 14–22 mm.

The larvae feed on Empetrum species, including Empetrum nigrum.

References

Moths described in 1919
Phycitini
Moths of Europe